The Bureau of Cultural Heritage (BOCH) is the bureau of the Ministry of Culture of the Taiwan (ROC) responsible for preserving and restoring historic buildings, sites, communities, relics and cultural landscapes, as well as conserving traditional arts, folk culture and other cultural legacies of Taiwan.

History
The bureau was originally established as Headquarters Administration of Cultural Heritage on 1 October 2007 under the Council for Cultural Affairs (CCA). On 20 May 2012, the CCA was upgraded to the Ministry of Culture and Headquarters Administration of Cultural Heritage was upgraded to Bureau of Cultural Heritage.

Organizational structures
 Division of General Planning
 Division of Monuments and Settlements
 Division of Antiquities and Archaeological Sites
 Division of Traditional Arts and Folklore
 Institute of Cultural Heritage Research Preservation
 Secretariat
 Office of Budget, Accounting and Statistics
 Civil Service Ethics Office
 Personnel Office

Branches
The bureau operates a cultural heritage research center located at National Museum of Taiwan Literature in Tainan.

See also
 Culture of Taiwan
 List of national monuments of Taiwan

References

External links
 
 Bureau of Cultural Heritage website (in Chinese), includes a searchable database of protected objects

2007 establishments in Taiwan
Cultural organizations based in Taiwan
Executive Yuan
Government agencies established in 2007
Organizations based in Taichung